Love in a Mist (alternately titled Loveinamist) is the fifth studio album by British singer Marianne Faithfull, released in 1967. Michael Cooper is credited for the design and photography.

Many of the tracks had been released months earlier on the US-only Faithfull Forever. This would be her last studio album release until 1977's Dreamin' My Dreams.

Track listing
 "Yesterday" (John Lennon, Paul McCartney) - 2:15
 "You Can't Go Where the Roses Go" (Jackie DeShannon) - 2:55
 "Our Love Has Gone" (Chris Andrews) - 3:15
 "Don't Make Promises You Can't Keep" (Tim Hardin) - 2:48
 "In the Night Time" (Donovan) - 3:00
 "This Little Bird" (John D. Loudermilk) - 2:00
 "Ne Me Quitte Pas" (Jacques Demy, Michel Legrand) - 2:32
 "Counting" (Bob Lind) (UK version only) - 2:50
 "Reason to Believe" (Tim Hardin) - 2:17
 "Coquillages" (Marcel Stellman, Michael John Taylor) - 3:37
 "With You in Mind" (Jackie DeShannon) - 2:25
 "Young Girl Blues" (Donovan) - 3:35
 "Good Guy" (Donovan) - 2:45
 "I Have a Love" (Stephen Sondheim, Leonard Bernstein) - 2:45

Bonus tracks on 1988 CD re-issue:
 "Hang On to a Dream" (Tim Hardin)
 "Rosie, Rosie" (Ray Davies)
 "Monday, Monday" (John Phillips)

References

1967 albums
Marianne Faithfull albums
Decca Records albums